Liolaemus andinus, the Andes tree iguana or Andean lizard, is a species of lizard in the family  Liolaemidae. It is native to Argentina.

References

andinus
Reptiles described in 1895
Reptiles of Argentina
Taxa named by Julio Germán Koslowsky